The Most Reverend John Joseph Clancy (1856–1912) was an Irish Roman Catholic clergyman who served as the Bishop of Elphin from 1895 to 1912.

He was born on 23 December 1856 in Sooey, County Sligo, Ireland. He was educated at the Marist Brothers school in sligo and Summerhill College, in 1876 he went to Maynooth College to study for the priesthood. 
He went on to become professor of English Literature and French at Maynooth.
He was appointed Coadjutor Bishop of the Diocese of Elphin and Titular Bishop of Achantus on 12 January 1895. He succeeded as the Diocesan Bishop of Elphin on 8 February 1895 and ordained bishop on 24 March 1895. He died in office on 19 October 1912, aged 55 years old.

References

1856 births
1912 deaths
Roman Catholic bishops of Elphin
Clergy from County Sligo
Alumni of St Patrick's College, Maynooth